Newcastle Odeon was a 2,602-seat cinema located at Pilgrim Street in Newcastle upon Tyne, England. It opened as the Paramount Theatre in 1931 before being purchased by Odeon Cinemas in 1940. During the 1960s and 1970s it was also used for pop and rock concerts. The cinema closed in 2002, and stood empty until being demolished in 2017.

References

Former cinemas in England
Music venues in Tyne and Wear
Demolished buildings and structures in England
Buildings and structures demolished in 2017